Project Success is the fourth studio album by Dogbowl, released on December 8, 1993 by Shimmy Disc.

Track listing

Personnel 
Adapted from Flan liner notes.

 Dogbowl – lead vocals, guitar, illustrations
Musicians
 Sean Eden – guitar
 Race Age – drums, percussion
 Lee Ming Tah – bass guitar, steel guitar
 Christopher Tunney – clarinet, saxophone

Production and additional personnel
 Jamie Harley – engineering
 Kramer – production
 Michael Macioce – photography

Release history

References

External links 
 

1993 albums
Albums produced by Kramer (musician)
Dogbowl albums
Shimmy Disc albums